Heidi Sørensen (born 14 February 1970) is a Norwegian politician for the Socialist Left Party.

With a Danish father, Sørensen held Danish citizenship in her early life. She was born in Levanger, and studied for a cand.mag. degree between 1989 and 1992. In her youth Sørensen was an active environmentalist, and was leader of Natur og Ungdom between 1993 and 1994, and later became leader of Friends of the Earth Norway between 1995 and 1998. She was also a working committee member in No to the EU from 1991 to 1995.

She was elected to the Parliament of Norway from Oslo in 2001, but was not re-elected in 2005. She instead served as a deputy representative, but met on a regular basis as Kristin Halvorsen was appointed to Stoltenberg's Second Cabinet. In October 2007 Sørensen left Parliament to become a cabinet member herself, serving as State Secretary in the Ministry of the Environment. Upon resignation in 2012 she returned to Parliament where she again served as a replacement for Kristin Halvorsen until the term ended in 2013.

Sørensen was a member of the Norwegian Consumer Council from 1997 to 2001, the Norwegian Board of Technology from 1999, the board of the Research Council of Norway from 2000 and the Norwegian School of Sport Sciences from 2013. She has also been a member of committees producing Norwegian Official Reports on energy and waste management.

References

1970 births
Living people
Norwegian people of Danish descent
People from Levanger
Politicians from Oslo
Socialist Left Party (Norway) politicians
Members of the Storting
Norwegian state secretaries
Nature and Youth activists
Norwegian environmentalists
Norwegian women environmentalists
Women members of the Storting
21st-century Norwegian politicians
21st-century Norwegian women politicians
Norwegian women state secretaries